Hernando Guerra-García Campos (born 14 May 1963) is a Peruvian businessman and politician. In 2016, he ran for the Presidency under the National Solidarity-UPP alliance for the general elections for the same year. However, after a few months he withdrew from the electoral campaign. He was Keiko Fujimori's campaign manager in the 2021 general election.

Biography 
Guerra was born in Lima, his parents were former congressman Roger Guerra-García Cueva and Mabel Campos Montoya, who died when he was 16 years old. His grandfather, Antenor Guerra García Vallejo, was president of the Superior Court of Cajamarca.

He completed his school studies at the Colegio Sagrados Corazones Recoleta in Lima.

He studied law at the Catholic University, where he obtained a bachelor's degree. He studied a Master's Degree in Administration (MBA) at the School of Business Administration (ESAN).

In 1990, he was deputy editor of El peruano, the official newspaper of the Republic of Peru, where he was part of the relaunch project. In the official gazette he had a section called Los profiles del carajo in reference to the book Profiles of Courage by John F. Kennedy. He worked in the official gazette until 1994.

He was Chief of Communications of the National Superintendency of Tax Administration (SUNAT) until 1996.

In 2001 he founded Clientes y Organizations, and in 2004 he was part of Somos Empresa, a television program awarded by ANDA and considered in 2008 as the best on TV in economic matters.

Political career 
During his youth he was a member of the Revolutionary Socialist Party (PSR).

In 2011 he was a pre-candidate for the presidency of Fuerza Social for the 2011 general elections of Peru.

In 2016, he decided to run for the Peruvian Humanist Party for the presidency of Peru, but due to decisions made in the party, he went to the National Solidarity-UPP alliance to run in the 2016 general elections in Peru. However, after a few months he withdrew from the electoral campaign.

In October 2020, he was presented by the Fuerza Popular political party to be its head of government plan and head of the list for Lima in the 2021 Peruvian parliamentary elections. After this, he was the target of controversy, because in the 2016 elections, he launched harsh criticism to this game. He was elected to Congress.

References 

1963 births
Living people
Fujimorista politicians
People from Lima
Candidates for President of Peru
National Solidarity Party (Peru) politicians
Peruvian Humanist Party politicians
Decentralist Social Force Party politicians